Mannu is a 1978 Malayalam film directed by K. G. George with Soman, P. K. Abraham, Sharada and Sukumaran in the lead roles. The feudal melodrama about greed & superstition narrates a tale of the struggle of the poor Damu (Soman) & his wife (Sharada) against the powerful landlord (P. K. Abraham) over tenancy rights.

Plot

Mannu is about the struggle between Damu, a tenant whose legal right to his land is obscure, and Krishnan Nair, a rapacious landlord. The local leader of the party, comrade Mulamkadan, supports the tenant. and the landlord's political strategy to evict the tenant fails. When the landlord goes to a Nambudiri priest, the priest advises recourse to the Lord.

One morning a Devi Vigraha (an idol) is discovered on Damu's land. The villagers are awed; the landlord promptly declares his intention to build a temple on the land. Damu tries to fight both landlord and superstition from within the village and fails. Krishnan Nair is killed and Damu is forced to go underground. His wife continues to fight to regain land that is rightfully hers. Krishnan Nair's son, Rajan returns from the front and searches for Damu, eventually tracking him down.

Cast
 M. G. Soman as Damu
 P. K. Abraham as Krishnan Nair
 Sharada as Paru, Damu's wife
 Sukumaran as Rajan, Krishnan Nair's son
 Adoor Bhasi as Supran Thirumeni
 Nellikkodu Bhaskaran as Mulankadan 
 Kuthiravattom Pappu  as Keshavan
 Mallika Sukumaran as Naani
 Kunjandi as Kakka
 Santha Devi as Krishnan's mother
 Nilambur Balan as Velappan
 Sreenivasan as Mathai
 R. K. Nair as Raghavan

Soundtrack
The music was composed by A. T. Ummer and the lyrics were written by Dr Pavithran.

References

External links
 
 Mannu at Cinemaofmalayalam.net

1970s Malayalam-language films
Films directed by K. G. George